Meri von KleinSmid (born 1974) is an American musician, artist and composer.

Life
Meri von KleinSmid was born in Los Angeles, California, and studied choral music, piano, violin and flute as a child. She was educated at the University of Washington and Columbia College Chicago, where she studied music history and ethnomusicology. She lived for a while in Cambridge, England, but later moved to the Seattle/Vancouver area. She has been a member of the experimental musical collective SoniCabal and the Chinese Music Society of North America, among other organizations. The CD 60X60, including her work, won an award at the Just Plain Folks Music Awards in Nashville, Tennessee.

Works
Selected works include:

Monorail
What Happens to the Deep-Sea Divers
I Dreamt the PNE
Are You Waiting for a Bus?
Late-Night Café
Waiting for the 99 B-Line
Ethereal Tether
The Observation of Curio No. 19

Her work has been issued on CD, including:
CHI-TAPE [American Archive Recordings, AAR005] (U.S.A.)
Women Take Back the Noise three disc compilation [Ubuibi] (U.S.A.)
ELEKTRAMUSIC Electroacoustic Music Volume 01 [Elektramusic, ELEK01] (France)
DISContact! III [CEC-PeP, PEP 007] (Canada)
Ex Vivo [Mimeomeme-Mimeograph] (U.S.A.)
60x60, 2004-2005 2-disc compilation [Vox Novus] (U.S.A.)

References

1974 births
Living people
20th-century classical composers
American women classical composers
American classical composers
Musicians from Los Angeles
University of Washington alumni
Columbia College Chicago alumni
20th-century American women musicians
20th-century American composers
21st-century American women musicians
Classical musicians from California
20th-century women composers